Molotov Solution is an American deathcore band from Las Vegas, Nevada, United States. They are notable for their politically charged lyrics, which include themes of government conspiracies and world issues. The band announced their hiatus on June 13, 2012, but has since reformed.

History
Molotov Solution was founded during 2004, the group's first release, The Path to Extinction was finished and released in 2005 and again in 2006 the band provided one half of a split release album with War from a Harlots Mouth.

In 2008, the group released a self-titled full-length album that had a "much more groove oriented approach". As guitarist Robbie Pina stated in Jason Bracelin's "Sounding Off" column;

Both the split album with War from a Harlots Mouth and the self-titled album were released on Twelve Gauge Records in 2006. Later in 2008, the entire line-up except for guitarist Robbie Pina and bassist Kevin Oakley left the band for unstated reasons. This resulted in a change of musical style, along with a different vocal style by new vocalist, Nick Arthur.

On December 10, 2008, Molotov Solution signed to Metal Blade and a new full-length album titled The Harbinger, recorded by Kelly Cairns, Daniel Castleman, and Tim Lambesis in his personal studio, was released on June 9, 2009.

By Spring 2010, Colisen, Oakley, and Johnson had left the band for their own reasons, but on good terms. Molotov Solution continued touring through 2010. Arthur and Pina picked up the pieces and found a few fill in member for a summer headlining tour and on the No Time to Bleed tour in October, headlined by Suicide Silence.

On December 8, 2010, it was announced that Molotov Solution signed with BlkHeart Group. The band also announced a few member changes to the lineup. The band released their third full-length album entitled Insurrection on October 25.

On January 5, 2012, it was announced that founding member/guitarist Robbie Pina had left the band and Cody Jarvis would serve as his temporary replacement. Jarvis had previously filled on for Pina while he was on a "personal" break from the band on the Age of Hell Tour co-headlined by Chimaira and Unearth.
On June 13, 2012, vocalist Nick Arthur revealed that the band would be taking an indefinite hiatus.

In December 2015, it was announced that Nick Arthur would be touring with Australian band Thy Art Is Murder following the departure of vocalist CJ McMahon.

On November 25, 2021, the band announced that the album Insurrection has been remastered, including the track "The Infernal Machine", a song that was never released digitally.

Members

Current members
 Robbie Pina – guitar (2004–2012, 2014–present)
 Nick Arthur – lead vocals (2008–2012, 2014–present)
 Jake Durrett - Drums (2010-2012, 2014-present)

Past members
 Justin Fornof – bass (2005–2006, currently in Wristmeetrazor)
 Mike Degilormo – bass guitar (2006)
 Cassidy Sprague – guitar (2004–2007)
 Matt Manchuso – drums (2004–2008)
 Kyle Davis – lead vocals (2004–2008)
 Sims Housten-Collison – guitar (2008–2010)
 Jeremy Johnson – drums (2008–2010)
 Kevin Oakley – bass (2006–2010)
 Shane Slade – bass (2010–2012)
 Jake Durrett – drums (2010–2012)
 Richie Gomez – guitar (2010–2012)

 Timeline

Discography

Videography

References

American death metal musical groups
American deathcore musical groups
Metalcore musical groups from Nevada
Metal Blade Records artists
Musical groups established in 2004
Musical quintets